Sphingomonas panni  is a Gram-negative, non-spore-forming and rod-shaped bacteria from the genus of Sphingomonas which has been isolated from a sponge from an examination room in the University for Veterinary Medicine Vienna in Austria.

References

Further reading

External links
Type strain of Sphingomonas panni at BacDive -  the Bacterial Diversity Metadatabase

panni
Bacteria described in 2005